Series 2131 (ex JŽ 731) is a diesel locomotive series on Croatian Railways.

External links
 2131 at zeljeznice.net 

2131
Đuro Đaković (company)